Emilio de Villota Ruíz (born 26 July 1946) is a former racing driver from Spain, born in Madrid. He entered 15 Formula One World Championship Grands Prix between 1976 and 1982, qualifying twice. He entered most Spanish Grand Prix between 1976 and 1982 and became a major force in the short-lived Aurora AFX Formula One Championship for F1 cars, winning the title in 1980.

Career

De Villota first arrived on the international motor sport scene in 1972, when he raced a SEAT 124 SC, in the 4 Horas de Jarama, a round of the European Touring Car Championship [ETCC]. In a car entered by Scuderia Filipinetti, was co-driven by H. Hengstenberg to 15th place overall. De Villota would not return to international motor sport until 1975, when he re-visited the ETCC, this time in a Ford Capri RS 2600, this time aided by Jorge de Bagration. The pair did not finish in the Zandvoort Trophy, held at the Circuit Park Zandvoort. However, when the Spanish pairing were joined by "Nicha" Cabral, for their home race, the 4 Horas de Jarama, they finished second, albeit five laps adrift of the winner.

For 1976, de Villota turned his back on Touring Cars to try his luck in single-seaters, with the ultimate aim of racing in the World Championship. In order to gain experience of high-powered racing cars, he entered the Shellsport G8 International Series. This was a UK-based Formula Libre championship which ran F1, F2, F5000 and Formula Atlantic cars in the same races. Racing with the Lyncar Engineering Ltd., de Villota scored two 5th places, and finished the season 14th in the overall standings.

Using a regulation which allowed the participation of private teams or drivers who could purchase a car and race alongside the official teams, de Villota debuted in the 1976 World Championship driving a Cosworth powered Brabham BT44B, purchased in effect to participate in the Gran Premio de España. De Villota failed to qualify, and did not return until the following season.

De Villota returned to England for the start of the next season, once again racing for Lyncar which was now entered under the name of Iberia Airlines, winning for opening race of the 1977 Shellsport G8 International Series, at Mallory Park. However, after just four meetings, de Villota abandoned the series for F1.

In 1977, de Villota developed a more ambitious project that would make him the third Spaniard to participate in Formula 1 after Alfonso de Portago and Alex Soler-Roig. Under the sponsorship of Iberia, de Villota led a modest outfit that raced under the name of Iberia Airlines F1 and contested seven Grands Prix of the European season. For the project Iberia acquired a McLaren M23, Ford-Cosworth DFV engines, the cars painted in the colours of the airline. De Villota would qualify for just two of these Grands Prix, the first was his home event, Gran Premio de España, where he would finish 13th, albeit 5 laps adrift of the winner. The other race he started was the Grand Prix von Österreich, where an accident on the last lap deprived him of the finish, nevertheless classified in 17th position.

Between Grands Prix, de Villota did a number of selected Shellsport G8 races in his F1 McLaren, winning twice. He followed his earlier victory at Mallory, by winning there again, then taking the chequered flag at Brands Hatch. Although his season was split in two by his Grand Prix racing, de Villota still finished 5th in the championship.

Again he attempted to privately contest the 1978 Gran Premio de España, failing again in qualifying. After this failure he turned his back on Formula One and turned his attention to the new Aurora AFX Formula One Championship. In the Aurora championship, racing was cheaper and was therefore less dependent on sponsorships, thus making it more competitive. This proved to be the case with de Villota finishing 3rd overall in 1978 and 1979, then being proclaimed champion in 1980 with a RAM Racing prepared Williams FW07. During this spell, he won nine races, including the infamous Gran Premio Lotteria di Monza.

His main focus for 1978, was the Aurora AFX F1 Championship. This series replaced the Shellsport Group 8 series. He continued to race his McLaren, now entered under the Centro Asegurador banner. The season started promising the trip to the podium in the first three races, however he was unable to keep the momentum going and failed to visit the podium again, although it was still enough to finish 3rd overall at the end of the season.

For the 1979 Aurora AFX F1 Championship, de Villota switched to Lotus-Cosworth 78, prepared and entered by Madom F1 Team.  Following a series of poor results, de Villota turned his season around by finishing on the podium in six straights races, winning four of them at Thruxton, Zandvoort, Oulton Park, and Nogaro. Then his poor early season form returned with three retirements in the last five races, with only one point finish. This left him 3rd once again in the overall standings.

He again tried to qualify for the 1980 Gran Premio de España at the wheel of a RAM Racing prepared Williams-Cosworth FW07, which Banco Occidental sponsorship. Originally scheduled to be part of the Formula One World Championship, following the running of the race it was announced that World Championship points would not be awarded to the competitors, making it a non-championship race. He distinguished himself during the race by tripping up both Carlos Reutemann and Jacques Laffite in their battle for the lead.

Back in the Aurora AFX F1, de Villota was at the wheel of the same Williams FW07, as he raced in Spain. Having switched to RAM Racing for the Aurora series as well, de Villota brought the FW07 home, on the podium in nine of eleven races he entered, winning five of them. Twice at Mallory Park, Brands Hatch, Silvestone and the big money event in Italy, the Gran Premio Lotteria di Monza. For one race, RAM switched de Villota to their Fittipaldi F5A, in which he still finished in 5th position. Adding this to the other trips to the podium, de Villota was crowned champion.

For 1981, de Villota made the switch to the World Endurance Championship of Drivers. Having signed for Team Lola, to race their Group 6 Cosworth DFV powered Lola T600, alongside Guy Edwards, they made a poor start to the season, failing to finish their first two races. After an 8th place in the ADAC 1000 km Rennen Nürburgring, the pair are joined by Juan Fernández, for what would be de Villota's first race at the Circuit de la Sarthe. The trio finish 15th overall, and 3rd in class. The strong result from Le Mans inspired de Villota and Edwards who would win their next race, the Coppa Florio, 6 ore Enna-Pergusa by two laps, albeit from a field made up by entrants from the Italian Group 6 Championship. The pair would win once more in 1981, this time for season finale, Flying Tiger 1000. In the intermittent rain at Brands Hatch, they would win by a margin of eight laps.

In 1982 made his final attempt to qualify for another Formula 1 race. As a privateer again (with LBT Team March) and this time in a March 821, powered by Ford Cosworth, sought qualification, unsuccessfully for five Grands Prix, It was to be the first time in his career as a racing driver, he would crossed the Atlantic to compete outside Europe.

Away from F1, de Villota continued to race sportscar, in the new Group C category with the Grid Plaza Racing team. The team was under-financed, and undertook a limited World Endurance Championship for Drivers and Manufacturers and Camel GT Championship programme in 1982, and only once finished in the points, claiming 10th in the Shell Oils 1000 Kilometres, at Brands Hatch, when de Villota was joined by Derek Daly and Fred Stiff.

De Villota continued with Grid Racing into 1983. However, their Cosworth-powered Grid S1 remained unreliable, with de Villota only finishing once in the points. Like 1982, this was at Brands Hatch, in the European Endurance Championship race. For the Grand Prix International 1000km, he was joined by Skeeter McKitterick and Dudley Wood, as they bring the Grid home in 8th place. Away from sportscars, de Villota tried his hand in two other categories with very mixed success. He had two drives in Formula Two; a 9th place at Silverstone with James Gresham Racing, in their March-BMW 832 and 13th at Jarama, for Minardi Team Srl aboard their Minardi-BMW M283. The other category was away from the international scene. Driving a Ford Capri RS3000, de Villota won the Spanish Touring Car Championship.

For 1984, Grid Racing had produced a new car, the Grid-Porsche S2. De Villota raced the car in the Budweiser Grand Prix of Miami, but did not complete a lap. He did not race again that season. He did return to the ETCC in 1985 with Escuderia Mezquita, taking in two races. He co-drove with Francisco Romero, finishing both races; 18th in the Vallelunga 500 km and 17th in the Donington 500, in their VW Golf GTi.

Having obtained Spanish backing from Danone for 1986, John Fitzpatrick Racing needed two Spanish drivers. De Villota was one, and he was joined at the team by Fermín Velez. Although the pair only racing seven times, they scored five top ten finished in the Porsche 956. This included a 3rd in the ADAC Kouros 1000 km Nürburgring, and a 4th in the 24 Hour of Le Mans. This would be de Villota's last trip to Le Mans 24 hours.

The opening two races of the 1987 World Sport-Prototype Championship was held in Spain, Kremer Racing paired two local drivers for these races. Paco Romero joined de Villota in the Marlboro-sponsored Porsche 962C. The pair finished 10th at Jarama and then 8th at Jerez. De Villota stepped away from Group C racing, to race to 8th overall in the Porsche 944 Turbo Cup.

By 1988, de Villota had retired from International racing, although he still won three Spanish Porsche Carrera Cup Championships in four years (1993, 1995 and 1996) at national level. However, in 1996 he raced in Porsche 911 Bi-Turbo in the Gran Premio Repsol Resistencia Del Jarama, a round of the BRP Global GT series, alongside Pablo de Villota and Fulvio Ballabio. It would be five more years before he reappears, this time at Estoril, racing a Porsche 911 GT2, in a Spanish GT race. De Villota still races, albeit mostly in Spain.

After retiring 

He currently heads the team and racing school, Emilio de Villota Motorsport. His son Emilio de Villota Jr. has raced in Formula Three and Formula 3000. His daughter María de Villota was a test driver for Marussia F1; a major crash in a test in July 2012 left her with serious injuries; she died in October 2013.

Racing record

Career highlights

Complete Formula One World Championship results
(key)

Non-Championship Formula One results
(key)

Complete Shellsport International Series results
(key) (Races in bold indicate pole position; races in italics indicate fastest lap)

Complete British Formula One Championship results
(key) (Races in bold indicate pole position; races in italics indicate fastest lap)

Complete World Sportscar Championship results
(key) (Races in bold indicate pole position; races in italics indicate fastest lap)

Complete 24 Hours of Le Mans results

Complete European Formula Two Championship results
(key) (Races in bold indicate pole position; races in italics indicate fastest lap)

References

External links
  

1946 births
Living people
Spanish racing drivers
Sportspeople from Madrid
Spanish Formula One drivers
British Formula One Championship drivers
European Formula Two Championship drivers
24 Hours of Le Mans drivers
Porsche Supercup drivers
RAM Racing Formula One drivers
March Formula One drivers
World Sportscar Championship drivers
Sports car racing team owners